Beat Street (Original Motion Picture Soundtrack) – Volume 1 and Beat Street (Original Motion Picture Soundtrack) – Volume 2 are soundtrack albums for the 1984 drama film of the same name. It was released in 1984 by Atlantic Records. Both albums were produced by Harry Belafonte, a calypso artist best known for his 1956 hit "Day-O (The Banana Boat Song)", and prolific freestyle music producer and remixer Arthur Baker, who collaborated with music artists including Freeez, Afrika Bambaataa, and New Order.

Both albums even entered the Billboard 200 and R&B Albums charts and stayed there in the same year.

Description
The soundtrack contains music mainly from old-school hip-hop artists including Grandmaster Melle Mel and the Furious Five, Jazzy Jay, Afrika Bambaataa & The Soul Sonic and Treacherous Three featuring beatbox pioneer Doug E. Fresh but also various electro/boogie musicians such as Freeez, and the System and Juicy.  
 
The album was certified gold in the same year.

A third volume was planned, but it was never released. The second volume was never released on CD.

Track listing

Volume 1 (80154) 
A-side

B-side

Volume 2 (80158) 
A-side

B-side

Credits and personnel

Sanford Allen – concertmaster, violin
Arthur Baker – bass, drums, producer
Tina Baker – performer
Katreese Barnes – performer
Sharon Green – performer
Milton Barnes – performer
David Belafonte – sound effects
Sandra Billingslea – violin
Jay Burnett  – guitar
Kennan Keating- wah wah guitar
Jenny Burton – vocals
Jack Cavari – guitar
John Clark – French horn
Deodato – producer
Lewis Eley – violin
Jon Faddis – trumpet
Eileen Folson – cello
Winterton Garvey – violin
Dwight Hawkes – backing vocalist
Lamar Hill – performer
Cecilia Hobbs – violin
Stanley Hunte – violin
Jean Ingraham – violin
Anthony Jackson – bass

Jazzy Jay – drum programming, scratching
Bashiri Johnson – percussion
Kevin Keaton – performer
Robbie Kilgore – bells
La La – sound effects, backing vocalist
Jesse Levy – cello
Webster Lewis - DX-7, Fender Rhodes, piano
Peter Link – performer
Chris "Lord-Alge" Simmons – drums
Guy Lumia – violin
John Pintavalle – violin
Sue Pray – viola
Maxine Roach – viola
Ralph Rolle – drum programming, sound effects, vocals
Alan Rubin – trumpet
Lew Soloff – trumpet
David Spinozza – guitar
Marti Sweet  – violin
Tina B. – vocals
Lenny Underwood – bass, drums, keyboards
Buddy Williams – drums
Richard D. Young – violin
Fred Zarr – bass, keyboards

Charts

Volume 1

Volume 2

Album certifications

References 

East Coast hip hop albums
Electro albums
Boogie albums
Drama film soundtracks
1984 soundtrack albums
Albums produced by Arthur Baker (musician)
Atlantic Records soundtracks